"Angel" is a power ballad by American rock band Aerosmith.  It was written by lead singer Steven Tyler and professional songwriting collaborator Desmond Child.

It was released in 1988 as the third single from the band's 1987 album, Permanent Vacation. It quickly climbed to No. 3 on the Billboard Hot 100, which at the time was their highest-charting single ever. The song currently ranks second behind their 1998 smash "I Don't Want to Miss a Thing", which was Aerosmith's first (and, as of 2022, only) single to top the Hot 100.

Reception
Cash Box called it a "searing rock ballad" on which "Steven Tyler recreates the emotional intensity of the classic 'Dream On.'"

Song structure
The song is in E major.

Personnel 

 Steven Tyler – lead vocals, piano, organ
 Joe Perry – lead guitar, backing vocals
 Brad Whitford – rhythm guitar
 Tom Hamilton – bass guitar
 Joey Kramer – drums

Additional musicians

 Drew Arnott – mellotron
 Henry Christian – trumpet
 Bruce Fairbairn – trumpet, cello, background vocals
 Scott Fairbairn – cello

Charts

Weekly charts

Year-end chart

References

1980s ballads
1987 songs
1988 singles
Aerosmith songs
Geffen Records singles
Glam metal ballads
Music videos directed by Marty Callner
Song recordings produced by Bruce Fairbairn
Songs written by Desmond Child
Songs written by Steven Tyler
Glam metal songs